Kushk Darreh (also Romanized as Kūshk Darreh; also known as Kūshkdarreh) is a village in Haparu Rural District, in the Central District of Bagh-e Malek County, Khuzestan Province, Iran. At the 2006 census, its population was 229, in 48 families.

References 

Populated places in Bagh-e Malek County